Antonio "Tony" Sotomayor (1902–1985) was a Bolivian-born American artist and educator, known as a painter and muralist. He also worked as an illustrator, caricaturist, designer, and ceramicist. He was nicknamed San Francisco's 'Artist Laureate'.

Early life 
Antonio Sotomayor was born on May 13, 1902, in Chulumani, Bolivia to parents Celia Meza and Juan Sotomayor. He studied at Escuela de Bellas Artes in La Paz, with Belgian metal artist .

Career 
In 1923, Sotomayor immigrated to San Francisco. He initially working as a dishwasher at the Palace Hotel, a role that only lasted five days. While working at the Palace he learned English and he would paint caricatures of his co-workers at the hotel, eventually they made him the "artist in residence". In the 1930s he painted two murals at the Palace Hotel, in the room known as “The Pied Piper.” When he had first arrived in San Francisco he had wanted to be an architect, but over time he changed. He continued his studies at the Mark Hopkins Institute of Art (now San Francisco Art Institute).

Sotomayor was an art professor at Mills College from 1942 to 1943. He taught art at California School of Fine Art (now the San Francisco Art Institute) from 1940 to 1950.

In 1937, he painted El Tigrero (1937) mural for the Richard Neutra designed Arthur and Mona Hofmann House in nearby Hillsborough, California. In 1939, he created murals for the Peruvian Pavilion and the Fountain of the Pacific, (a 36 foot by 46 foot, terracotta relief map) for the Golden Gate International Exposition on Treasure Island, 1939-1940 (GGIE). The relief map was executed at Gladding McBean in Lincoln, California. The fountain is one of very few surviving artifacts of the GGIE still existing on Treasure Island. The Treasure Island Museum is making efforts to have the fountain restored and placed on display once again.

For over a decade, he was a member of the San Francisco Arts Commission and received their "Award of Honor" in 1978.

He had a strong interest in religious art. In the early 1980s, Sotomayor painted a 30-panel mural for Grace Cathedral. Sotomayor was a member of San Francisco Art Association; The Family; and Bohemian Club.

Death and legacy 
Sotomayor died on February 10, 1985, at San Francisco Community Hospice, after a battle with cancer. His work is included in various public museum collections including Fine Arts Museums of San Francisco, Museum of Modern Art, among others.

Personal life 
He was married to Grace Andrews Sotomayor in 1927, they never had any children. For forty years they lived in the Nob Hill neighborhood on Leroy Place in San Francisco.

Bibliography 
Books with illustrations by Sotomayor.

See also 
 List of people from San Francisco

References 

1902 births
1985 deaths
San Francisco Art Institute alumni
People from Sud Yungas Province
Artists from San Francisco
American illustrators
American children's book illustrators
American caricaturists
American muralists
Bolivian emigrants to the United States